In Secret may refer to:

 In Secret (film), a 2013 American erotic thriller romance film 
 In Secret (horse), an Australian Thoroughbred race horse